Bravaisia is a genus of plants in the family Acanthaceae.

There are 3 known species in the genus and 1 unresolved, while others are considered to be synonyms.

List of species

 Bravaisia berlandieriana (Nees) T.F.Daniel 
 Bravaisia floribunda DC. synonym of Bravaisia integerrima (Spreng.) Standl. 
 Bravaisia grandiflora Donn.Sm. 
 Bravaisia integerrima (Spng.) Standl. 
 Bravaisia integerrima var. pilosa Steyerm. synonym of Bravaisia integerrima (Spreng.) Standl. 
 Bravaisia proxima Blake synonym of Bravaisia grandiflora Donn.Sm. 
 Bravaisia tubiflora Hemsl. (Unresolved)

References

Acanthaceae
Acanthaceae genera